MVAPICH, also known as MVAPICH2, is a BSD-licensed implementation of the MPI standard developed by Ohio State University. MVAPICH comes in a number of flavors:
 MVAPICH2, with support for InfiniBand, iWARP, RoCE, and Intel Omni-Path
 MVAPICH2-X, with support for PGAS and OpenSHMEM
 MVAPICH2-GDR, with support for InfiniBand and NVIDIA CUDA GPUs
 MVAPICH2-MIC, with support for InfiniBand and Intel MIC
 MVAPICH2-Virt, with support for InfiniBand and SR-IOV
 MVAPICH2-EA, which is energy-aware and supports InfiniBand, iWARP, and RoCE

See also 
 Open MPI
 MPICH

References

External links 
 
 MPI standards documents

Concurrent programming libraries
Free software